30 Coins is a Spanish mystery horror television series created by Álex de la Iglesia for HBO Europe. Directed and written by De la Iglesia and co-written by Jorge Guerricaechevarría, the series follows Father Vergara, an exorcist who is exiled by the church to Pedraza, a remote village in Spain where he hopes he is forgotten by his enemies.

The series premiered on November 29, 2020 on HBO Europe. Filming for the second season reportedly began in February 2022.

Synopsis
Father Vergara is an exorcist and ex-convict residing in the small Spanish town of Pedraza, attempting to move on from a troubled past. However, paranormal phenomena start taking place in the town and he will need the help of Paco, the mayor, and Elena, the town's veterinarian, to figure out a mystery seemingly related to a coin he owns, which might be one of the thirty pieces of silver paid to Judas Iscariot for betraying Jesus and handing him over to the Romans. The three will find themselves caught in the middle of a conspiracy involving the Holy See itself and threatening the world as we know it.

Cast
Introduced in season 1

Introduced in season 2

Production 

The series was produced by Pokeepsie Films for HBO Europe, with the participation of HBO Latin America.
Álex de la Iglesia and Carolina Bang (on behalf of Pokeepsie Films) and Miguel Salvat, Steve Matthews and Antony Root (on behalf of HBO Europe) were the series' executive producers. The musical score was composed by Roque Baños.

Most of the production took place in Pedraza, province of Segovia. Production also worked in Sepúlveda (also in the province of Segovia), and the Aldeadávila Dam (province of Salamanca). Other brief shooting locations include New York, Jerusalem, Paris, Geneva, Rome, Campo Real, Madrid, and Alcalá de Henares (including outdoor shots).

After months of rumours, social media content published by De la Iglesia regarding a new season and the self-announcement of Najwa Nimri as cast addition at the red carpet of the 9th Feroz Awards, HBO Max officially confirmed the return of the series for a second season on 11 February 2022, with shooting already underway. Footage for season 2 was shot in the city of Toledo.

Episodes

Release
The first episode of the eight-part first season premiered on HBO Europe on 29 November 2020. The rest of the episodes were released on a weekly basis. The series aired in the United States via HBO and HBO Max in 2021, prior to its airing on HBO Latin America.

The first episode was screened at the 77th Venice International Film Festival on September 11, 2020.

Reception
Scout Tafoya of RogerEbert.com found the series entertaining, writing that de la Iglesia and Guerricaechevarría "peddle a Catholic version of the Cosmic Horrors of William Hope Hodgson and H.P. Lovecraft"; "their style a crispy plait of Luis Buñuel and Alex Cox". Rosie Knight of IGN considers that "much of the strength of 30 Coins comes from [its] trio of leads," and that "easily the best thing about the show is that, aside from the horror, it also works as an Indiana Jones-style artifact quest," giving it 8 out of 10. Marissa de la Cerda writing for The A.V. Club writes "the grotesqueries that de la Iglesia is known for are on full display in the phantasmagoric visuals and viscera". She grades it a B, concluding that it "successfully lean[s] into its drama-horror hybrid to underscore the characters’ humanity."

Reviewing for Cinemanía, Miguel Ángel Romero considered De la Iglesia's creation as an immersion in the Lovecraftian universe, and also noted an implicit reference to Nyarlathotep in the season finale. Romero praised Cosimo Fusco's chilling performance and the performances of Eduard Fernández and Manolo Solo in antagonist roles, also welcoming the referencial nature of De la Iglesia's work (inspired by the likes of Antonio Mercero, Ridley Scott and John Carpenter). Among the negative aspects to be improved Romero cited the "particularly calamitous CGI" featured in the last episodes and the disjointed plots.

Accolades

|-
| rowspan = 7 align = "center" | 2021
| rowspan= 6 | 8th Feroz Awards
| Best Drama Series
| 30 Coins
| 
| rowspan = 6 | 
|-
| Best Main Actor in a TV Series
| Eduard Fernández
| 
|-
| Best Main Actress in a TV Series
| Megan Montaner
| 
|-
| Best Supporting Actor in a TV Series
| Manolo Solo
| 
|-
| rowspan=2|Best Supporting Actress in a TV Series
| Macarena Gómez
| 
|-
| Carmen Machi
| 
|-
| 71st Fotogramas de Plata || Best Television Actor || Eduard Fernández ||  || 
|-
| align = "center" rowspan = "3" | 2022 || rowspan = "2" | 9th  || colspan = "2" | Best Drama Series ||  || rowspan = "2" | 
|-
| Best Direction || Álex de la Iglesia || 
|-
| 30th Actors and Actresses Union Awards || Best TV Actor in a Minor Role || Secun de la Rosa ||  || align = "center" |

See also 
 2020 in Spanish television

References

External links

2020 Spanish television series debuts
HBO Europe original programming
2020s horror television series
Spanish mystery television series
Spanish thriller television series
Spanish-language television shows
Television shows set in Castile and León
Television shows set in Rome
Television shows filmed in Spain
Spanish horror fiction television series
Television series about witchcraft
Television shows about exorcism
Television series about demons
Television series about religion
Television shows about Catholicism
2020s Spanish drama television series
Spanish fantasy television series
2020s supernatural television series